Harmony is an unincorporated community in Clark County, in the U.S. state of Ohio.

History
Harmony was platted in 1832, and named after Harmony Township, in which it is located. A post office called Harmony was established in 1851, and discontinued in 1879.

References

Unincorporated communities in Clark County, Ohio
1832 establishments in Ohio
Populated places established in 1832
Unincorporated communities in Ohio